The 1929 Bulgarian State Football Championship was the sixth edition of the competition. It consisted of ten teams, and it was won by Botev Plovdiv, who defeated Levski Sofia 1–0 in the final. 

This was the first and last final played by Botev, while it was Levski's second appearance, following their first one in 1925.

Qualified teams
The winners from each OSO qualify for the State championship.

First round

|}

Quarter-finals

|}

Semi-finals

|}

Final

References
Bulgaria - List of final tables (RSSSF)

Bulgarian State Football Championship seasons
Bul
1